The Castile and León tournament is the previous round of the Copa RFEF in Castile and León. Organized by the Football Federation of Castile and León, the regional teams in Segunda División B and Tercera División (Group 8) that did not qualify for the Copa del Rey can play voluntarily this tournament, including reserve teams.

Format
The tournament is played between July and October, and the champion of the tournament qualifies to the National tournament of the Copa RFEF.

History

Source:

Champions
Not included titles given as only registered team.

References

External links
Football Federation of Castile and León 

Football in Castile and León
Castile and Leon